Little Mill Junction was a station on the former Coleford, Monmouth, Usk and Pontypool Railway, located between the main Newport, Abergavenny and Hereford Railway line and the branch to Usk. It served the village of Little Mill, Monmouthshire.

History
The first station was opened on 2 January 1854, and was then modified in 1856 during the construction of the branch line to Usk.  It was closed in 1955 following the withdrawal of passenger services on the line. It was located on the junction of the line with the Welsh Marches Line, 16 miles and 12 chains from Monmouth Troy. The station consisted of platforms on both lines, sidings and a station building, although the platforms on the mainline were taken out of use before the station's closure. The station building was demolished, but the signal box and junction remain intact.

References

The Great Western Railway: North & West Line by Stanley C Jenkins, Martin Loader

Disused railway stations in Monmouthshire
Former Great Western Railway stations
Railway stations in Great Britain opened in 1854
Railway stations in Great Britain closed in 1955